Man'yōshū Jidai-kō (万葉集時代考) is a Japanese research work written in Japan's early medieval period. It was written by the famed waka poet Fujiwara no Shunzei.

Authorship and date 
Man'yōshū Jidai-kō was written by Fujiwara no Shunzei, at the beginning of the Kamakura period. It was intended by Shunzei to answer the questions posed by the Gokyōgoku Regent (後京極摂政) Fujiwara no Yoshitsune. It contains a note that refers to Yoshitsune as taishō (于時大将), a title he held between Bunji 5 (1189) and Kenkyū 6 (1195). It has also been noted that it quotes the Man'yōshū Jidai Nanji (万葉集時代難事) composed by  during the Juei era (1182–1184). Based on these facts, it is believed that Shunzei created the work some time around Kenkyū 3 (1192).

Title 
Its title is sometimes shortened to Manji (万時). The inside title of the work reads Manji: Gojō-den Goshōsoku (万時・五条殿御消息). The Zoku Gunsho Ruijū text of the work has written on its cover Shunzei-kyō Man'yō Jidai-kō (俊成卿万葉時代考).

Contents 
The work is in one volume. It deals simply with the question surrounding the compilation of the Man'yōshū, taking the position that since there is insufficient reliable evidence for the events of the past, drawing easy conclusions about the past would be presumptuous, and based on the poems in the Man'yōshū itself comes down ultimately on the side that dates it to the Nara period. The work is important as a statement of the opinion of Shunzei, a man who was at the pinnacle of the poetic world of his time, when he was in his late seventies (likely around 79 by Japanese reckoning).

Textual tradition 
The manuscript in the holdings of the Imperial Household Agency Archives and Mausolea Department was copied by Emperor Reigen.

Other copies are in the holdings of the Tōyō Bunko, the University of Tokyo Library, the Nihon University Library, etc. These are all copied from a copy attributed to Shunzei himself and passed down in the Kujō family.

The Zoku Gunsho Ruijū text is a critical edition based on the Imperial Household Agency copy.

References

Citations

Works cited 

 

Fujiwara no Shunzei
Man'yōshū
Kamakura-period works